Sādhu or Sathu is a Pali word of Sanskrit origin which is used as a formula of approbation in both religious and secular contexts in Southeast Asia. It is a kind of Buddhist Amen, similar also to the Svāhā used as a denouement at the end of a mantra in Vedic religions which also served as a form of salutation. Though it is an "untranslatable phrase", it can be variously translated as "amen", "good", "yes" "thank you", "I have received", "well done",  "be it so" or "all shall be well".

Etymology 
In Sanskrit, sadhu describes a holy person or entity. This is used after someone has completed some task with excellence or fulfillment, often in a commitment to religious life.

In Pali, the word sathu means good, excellent, auspicious. It is used with this meaning in Dhammapada Verse 35: "The mind is difficult to control; swiftly and lightly, it moves and lands wherever it pleases. It is good (sathu) to tame the mind, for a well-tamed mind brings happiness."

While the Sanskrit refers to a mystic, the Pali refers to a moral attitude. The term Sadhu directed to a person therefore literally translates to “blessed one.” This can mean an enlightened being such as a Buddha, but also refers to the common man who strives for enlightenment in his own life.

Use

A shout for victory 
Satho is a cry for joy in ancient Vedic stories and it is still used in Hindu culture as a general shout of approval in battle. In the Thai version of a legend of the Bhagavad Gita translated by Eliakim Littell, the words sathu, sathu, are put in the mouth of the King:

An original word of Siddhartha 
This word was used by the Buddha when devotees asked him about deep or hard issues. Sadhu is therefore occasionally used in the Tripiṭaka as an exclamation. In the Vinaya Piṭaka, to show his appreciation of something Śāriputra had said, the Buddha responded:

An approbation cry 
Sathu is most often heard as a cry of approval at Buddhist sermons. The preacher usually ends his sermon by wishing that all present will one day attain nirvana which is greeted with cries in unison of "satho, satho". Buddhists say “Sathu Sathu Sathu” three times to answer a religious question or express their religious feelings if they find that the request is satisfactory. Its closest English equivalent would probably be ‘wow’ in this context.

It can be used in a religious setting by monks, such as when receiving offerings, as well as in a profane context; thus, when Burmese monk U Tiloka admonished the villagers to refuse to pay land revenue and capitation taxes in order to obtain home rule against the British Empire, he usually concluded his speeches by asking all who accepted his preaching to say sathu three times.

The sathu exclamation is sometimes associated to the sound of conch or to the striking of a gong being  to mark the end of the chapter, in such occasions as the sermons of the Vessantara Festival.

Blessing to be blessed 
Sathu may also used in prayers of petition bowing to an image of the Buddha or by soldiers offering obedience to kings or by believers praying to deities such as Burmese nats and devatas:

Interpretation

Triple repetition: discipline 
The threefold repetition of sathu is a very common place in Southeast Asia. Sathu repeated three times is interpreted as referring to three elements: a disciplined body, words, and mind.

Fourth utterance: respect 
Sadhu is sometimes repeated a fourth time in a longer and emphatic tone. The reason Buddhists utter the fourth “Sadhu” in such a long manner may be honorific with respect to those who are most disciplined according to the Noble Eightfold Path.

Popular culture

Social networks 
Sathu, sathu, sathu associated with a joint-hands emoticon has become a popular comment on social networks as sign of reverence and encouragement.

Music 
Saathukaan (Thai: สาธุการ) is the traditional melody used by Thai musicians for eulogy and oblation in honour of the Triple Gem, while as special Saathukaan played only by drums is an invitatory for great teachers. Thai pop singer Boom Boom Cash produced a song entitled Sathu (Thai: สาธุ) in May 2018. Contemporary worship music in Thailand also translates the Christian blessing as sathu, as in the translation of Blessed be your Name (Thai: เพลง สาธุการพระนาม).

References 

Interjections
Religious terminology
Redirects from closing lines
Pali words and phrases
Buddhism-related lists
Khmer folklore